"Hangover" is a song by English singer Taio Cruz from his third studio album, TY.O. Released on 4 October 2011 in United States, 18 October 2011 in Germany and 4 March 2012 in the United Kingdom, the song serves as the album's international lead single, and follows "Troublemaker" as the album's second British single. American rapper Flo Rida contributes guest vocals. Another alternate version of the song, titled "Takeover", was leaked online via NewJams.net.

Background
In an interview with Billboard, Taio said that fans can expect more uptempo dance tracks on his forthcoming album. Talking to Billboard, Cruz explained: "The new album will be out by the end of the year; it will be out before Christmas. The new single will be out very, very soon as well." He also said "It's definitely going to be more of the uptempo, fun, energetic vibe that you've heard on 'Break Your Heart', 'Higher' and 'Dynamite'." Speaking about potential collaborations, Cruz revealed: "There are a few guests—David Guetta and Ludacris ('Little Bad Girl')—but we have a couple more on there that will be good surprises too."

It was co-written and produced by Dr. Luke and Cirkut. This is Dr. Luke's third collaboration with Taio Cruz (after "Dynamite" and "Dirty Picture") and fifth collaboration with guest vocalist Flo Rida (after "Right Round", "Touch Me", "Who Dat Girl", and "Good Feeling"). This is also the third collaboration between Flo Rida and Cirkut, following "Who Dat Girl" and "Good Feeling".

Music video
A music video to accompany the release of "Hangover" was released to YouTube on 25 October. It lasts for a total length of four minutes and forty-nine seconds. Flo Rida makes a cameo in the video, which sees Cruz driving a speedboat down a high street. The clip also includes actor and comedian Bobby Lee dressed as a bear, being bottle-fed in a cot, and also visualises a party on a private jet. The video ends with a short scene in which Lee picks out "a black outfit" from a closet full of black outfits, then proceeds to dance, begging Cruz not to fire him.

Live performances
Cruz performed the song on The Tonight Show with Jay Leno and during the finale of The Voice of Hollands second season. He also performed it at grand launching of NET. TV in 2013 along with Break Your Heart.

Cover versions
Scottish heavy metal band Alestorm covered this song on their studio album Sunset on the Golden Age.

Russian post-hardcore band Rave-UP! covered this song.

Track listing
 Digital download
 "Hangover" – 4:03

 German CD single
 "Hangover" – 4:03
 "Hangover" (No Rap) – 4:00

 Digital download
 "Hangover" – 4:03
 "Hangover" (Laidback Luke Extended Remix) – 5:31
 "Hangover" (Laidback Luke Dub Remix) – 5:20
 "Hangover" (Hardwell Extended Remix) – 5:50
 "Hangover" (Stinkahbell Remix) – 3:47

 Digital download – EP
 "Hangover" (Laidback Luke Extended Remix) – 5:31
 "Hangover" (Laidback Luke Dub Remix) – 5:20
 "Hangover" (Hardwell Remix Radio Edit) – 3:12
 "Hangover" (Hardwell Extended Remix) – 5:50
 "Hangover" (Hardwell Instrumental) – 5:50
 "Hangover" (Jump Smokers Radio Edit) – 3:29
 "Hangover" (Jump Smokers Extended Mix) – 4:26
 "Hangover" (Jump Smokers Instrumental) – 4:24

Charts and certifications

Weekly charts

Year-end charts

Certifications 

|-

Radio and release history

References

2011 singles
Taio Cruz songs
Flo Rida songs
Songs written by Dr. Luke
Number-one singles in Switzerland
Number-one singles in Austria
Song recordings produced by Cirkut (record producer)
Songs about alcohol
Songs written by Flo Rida
Songs written by Cirkut (record producer)
Songs written by Taio Cruz
2011 songs
Island Records singles
Song recordings produced by Dr. Luke
Electronic rock songs